Euthera tentatrix is a species of fly in the family Tachinidae.

Distribution
Canada, United States, Bahamas.

References

Diptera of North America
Insects described in 1866
Dexiinae
Taxa named by Hermann Loew